Sir Robert Williams, 1st Baronet,  (21 January 1860 – 25 April 1938) was a Scottish mining engineer, pioneering explorer of Africa, entrepreneur, and railroad developer who was chiefly responsible for the discovery of the vast copper deposits in Katanga Province (now incorporated in the Democratic Republic of Congo) and Northern Rhodesia (now Zambia).

Life

Robert Williams was born and educated in Aberdeen.

Williams was closely associated, variously as an employee of, advisor to, and partner with Cecil Rhodes in his many enterprises from the time of their first meeting in 1885 at the de Beers diamond mine in Kimberley until Rhodes's death in 1902.  Williams planned and executed the creation of the Benguela railway through then Portuguese West Africa (now Angola).  In 1902, Williams took over the construction and completed the connection to Luau at the border to the Belgian Congo in 1929.

Williams was the managing Director of Tanganyika Concessions. founded in 1889. He promoted a market for European goods within southern Africa which was part of a change in trading from barter to currency.
He was vice-president of the Belgian Compagnie de Chemin de fer du Katanga (CFK) when it was founded in 1902.
He was also joint founder, with King Leopold II of Union Minière du Haut-Katanga in 1906.

After World War I he bought Park House, a mansion with several hundred acres of land at Drumoak in Aberdeenshire. He was granted the Freedom of the City of Aberdeen, and was created a baronet in 1928, of Park, Aberdeenshire. He also became a grand officer of the Order of the Crown (Belgium) and commander of the Royal Order of the Lion of Belgium and a knight commander of the Portuguese order of Christ.

See also
 Vila Robert Williams
 Central African Copperbelt

References 

 Dictionary of National Biography: Williams, Sir Robert, baronet (1860–1938), engineer and businessman

External links
 
 Sir Robert Williams Papers, TANKS Archive, University of Manchester Library

1860 births
1938 deaths
Williams, Sir Robert, 1st Baronet, of Park
British mining businesspeople
1900s in Angola
Scottish people of the British Empire
British railway civil engineers
British railway entrepreneurs
People from Aberdeen
Sir Robert Williams

Grand Officers of the Order of the Crown (Belgium)
Commanders of the Royal Order of the Lion
Commanders of the Order of Christ (Portugal)
British expatriates in South Africa
Scottish mining engineers
Scottish explorers
Explorers of Africa
British expatriates in Angola